Abdelaziz Mitwali (Arabic:عبد العزيز متولي; born 20 March 1996) is a Qatari born-Egyptian footballer. He currently plays as a left back for Al-Shamal.

Career

Qatar
Mitwali started his career at Qatar and is a product of the Qatar's youth system. On 9 December 2015, Mitwali made his professional debut for Qatar against Al-Gharafa in the Pro League .

Al-Khor (loan)
On 1 February 2018, he left Qatar and signed with Al-Khor on loan until the end of the season. On 3 February 2018, Mitwali made his professional debut for Al-Khor against Al-Gharafa in the Pro League .

External links

References

Living people
1996 births
Qatari footballers
Qatari people of Egyptian descent
Naturalised citizens of Qatar
Qatar SC players
Al-Khor SC players
Al-Shamal SC players
Qatar Stars League players
Qatari Second Division players
Association football fullbacks
Place of birth missing (living people)